The 11th Pan American Games were held in Havana, Cuba from August 2 to August 18, 1991.

Medals

Gold

Men's Team Competition: Puerto Rico national basketball team
José Ortiz, Federico López, Raymond Gause, Edwin Pellot, Jerome Mincy, James Carter, Javier Antonio Colón, Ramón Rivas, Mario Morales, Edgar Leon, Pablo Alicea, and Richard Soto

Men's Flyweight (– 56 kg): Luis Martínez

Men's Doubles: Miguel Nido and Joey Rivé

Silver

Men's Team Competition: Puerto Rico national baseball team

Men's Bantamweight (– 54 kg): Carlos Gerena
Men's Light-Middleweight (– 71 kg): Miguel Jiménez
Men's Super Heavyweight (+ 91 kg): Harold Arroyo

Women's Heavyweight (+ 72 kg): Nilmaris Santini
Women's Open Class: Nilmaris Santini

Men's 400m Freestyle: Jorge Herrera
Men's 1500m Freestyle: Jorge Herrera
Men's 100m Breaststroke: Todd Torres
Men's 200m Individual Medley: Manuel Guzmán
Men's 4x100m Medley: David Monasterio, Jorge Herrera, Todd Torres, and Ricardo Busquets

Men's Team: Puerto Rico
Miguel Nido, Joey Rivé, and Jaime Frontera

Men's Freestyle (– 62 kg): Anibal Nieves

Bronze

Men's Light Flyweight (– 48 kg): Nelson Dieppa
Men's Light Welterweight (– 63.5 kg): Aníbal Santiago Acevedo
Men's Middleweight (– 75 kg): Richard Santiago

Men's Vault: Victor Colon

Women's Half Lightweight (– 52 kg): Lisa Boscarino
Women's Lightweight (– 56 kg): Maniliz Segarra

Men's 200m Backstroke: Manuel Guzmán
Men's 4x100m Freestyle: David Monasterio, Jorge Herrera, Manuel Guzmán, and Ricardo Busquets
Men's 4x200m Freestyle: David Monasterio, Jorge Herrera, Manuel Guzmán, and Ricardo Busquets

Mixed Doubles: Jaime Frontera and Emilie Viqueira

Results by event

See also

Puerto Rico at the 1990 Central American and Caribbean Games
Puerto Rico at the 1992 Summer Olympics

References

Nations at the 1991 Pan American Games
1991 in Puerto Rican sports
1991